The 1991–92 NBA season was the Magic's 3rd season in the National Basketball Association. Orlando hosted the 1992 NBA All-Star Game and All-star weekend, where Nick Anderson participated in the Slam Dunk Contest (losing in the semi-final round).

During the offseason, the Magic signed free agent Anthony Bowie. Finally returning to the Eastern Conference and settling into the Atlantic Division, the Magic had a disappointing third season. After winning their first three games leading them to a 6–8 start, the team suffered a winless month in December losing all 15 games, plus a 17-game losing streak in early January. Second-year star Dennis Scott played just 18 games due to a leg injury, while leading scorer Nick Anderson, who averaged 19.9 points per game missed 22 games.

The Magic finished last place in the Atlantic Division with a 21–61 record, which landed them with the number one overall pick in the 1992 NBA draft. Following the season, rookie Stanley Roberts was traded to the Los Angeles Clippers.

Draft picks

Roster

Regular season

Season standings

y – clinched division title
x – clinched playoff spot

z – clinched division title
y – clinched division title
x – clinched playoff spot

Record vs. opponents

Game log

Player statistics

Season

Awards and records
 Stanley Roberts – All-Rookie 2nd Team

Transactions

Player Transactions Citation:

References

External links
 1991-92 Orlando Magic Statistics

Orlando Magic seasons
1991 in sports in Florida
1992 in sports in Florida